Narendra Singh Arjun (1935 – 13 January 2006) was a Fijian lawyer and politician of Indian descent. In the course of his career, he served as president of the Fiji Law Society and as a member of the Sugar Industry Tribunal.

A National Federation Party (NFP) member of the House of Representatives from 1992 to 1999, Arjun was a member of the parliamentary committee that oversaw the review of the Constitution in the late 1990s.

The Fiji Times reported on 16 January 2006 that Arjun had died in Brisbane, Australia, after a long illness. His wife Veronica, two sons, and a daughter survived him.

1935 births
2006 deaths
National Federation Party politicians
Indian members of the House of Representatives (Fiji)
Politicians from Nasinu
Fijian politicians of Indian descent